The Hannahville Indian Community is a federally recognized Potawatomi tribe residing in Michigan's Upper Peninsula, approximately  west of Escanaba on a  reservation.

The 2020 census reported a resident population of 720 persons within its territory, most of whom were of Native American heritage. , the tribe had an enrolled membership of 891 people.

History
The people of Hannahville are descendants of Potawatomie people who refused to leave Michigan in 1834 for Indian Territory during the great Indian removal. For a period, they moved away from Michigan, living with the Menominee in northern Wisconsin, and the Ojibwe and Ottawa peoples in Canada. The Potawatomie, together with the Ojibwe and Odawa, are part of the Council of the Three Fires. In 1853, some Potawatomie returned to Michigan. It was at this time they settled along the mouth of the Big Cedar River at Lake Michigan.

According to the Methodist Church, Peter Marksman was sent to the area as an assistant minister. During this time, he was credited with finding a parcel of land and moving the Potawatomi people to the current location. Some church records report that, as the Potawatomi were very fond of Marksman's wife, Hannah, they named their community after her.

Hannahville Community

The first designation of this area as specifically Potawatomi land was recorded by the US federal government in 1870. The reservation was established by an act of Congress in 1913.

Under the Indian Reorganization Act of 1934, the tribe wrote a constitution and organized an elected form of government. It was officially recognized by the federal government in 1937. Members elect a 12-person Tribal Council, which makes decisions for governing the community.

In 1966 the tribe joined with three others in Michigan to establish the Inter-Tribal Council of Michigan, Inc. Other founding members were Keweenaw Bay Indian Community, Bay Mills Indian Community, and Saginaw Chippewa Indian Tribe. These small tribes wanted to work together for joint welfare, to manage joint projects, and to improve relations with the state and federal governments.

Reservation improvements
In 1966 the reservation acquired electricity for the first time. The "Lights for Christmas Project" was a multi-agency sponsored effort. Agencies involved included the Upper Peninsula Committee for Area Progress (UPCAP), the Community Action Agency, the Bureau of Indian Affairs, and the Marquette Catholic Diocese. In December 1966 linemen from the Alger-Delta Cooperative Electric Association of Gladstone, Michigan began running electrical lines from the Harris area (i.e. The cable installation was completed on Dec. 23, 1966.

A team of 40 volunteer electricians from throughout the state began wiring 16 reservation homes to receive electricity. All 40 electricians were members of the International Brotherhood of Electricians. The 16 homes were completed and ready for "flipping the switch" late that evening. On Dec. 23, 1966 at 3 p.m. EST a small handful of local county officials and community members watched as "hotlines" were activated at Hannahville for the first time.

The Marquette Catholic Diocese donated the $6,000 abandonment deposit required by the Alger-Delta Cooperative Electric Association. Each of the 16 households to receive electricity paid the Cooperative membership fee of $5. In this same period, the BIA had approved a housing project for new residences in Hannahville. The cooperative required the deposit against the contingency that the new houses might not be built.

Geography
The community also had  of off-reservation trust land.

Demographics
As of the census of 2020, the population of the Hannahville Indian Community and off-reservation trust land was 720. Of these residents, 325 lived within the community, and 395 lived on off-reservation trust land. The racial makeup of the reservation and off-reservation trust land was 75.1% Native American, 13.1% White, 0.1% Black or African American, 0.1% from other races, and 11.5% from two or more races. Ethnically, the population was 2.4% Hispanic or Latino of any race.

According to the 1990 Census of Population and Housing for Michigan, the per capita income for the Hannahville community in 1989 was $4,625, whereas the per capita for the state of Michigan was $14,154.

Approximately 100 additional members live nearby and access services on the Reservation. Since the late 20th century, the Tribe has been committed to developing environmental protection programs to ensure a healthy and safe environment for current and future generations.

Education
Hannahville Indian School is the tribal school.

See also
 Anishinaabe
 Council of Three Fires
 Potawatomi

References
Hannahville Community and Off-Reservation Trust Land, Michigan United States Census Bureau

External links
 Official Tribe website
 Potawatomi Language Vocabulary, Audio & Video, Interactive Language Games, Online Language Courses
 Hannahville Indian School - Nah Tah Wahsh PSA
 "Recollections of Earl J. Meshigaud, Sr.", Hannahville Potawatomi, hosted by BIA
 "Hannahville Potawatomi Indian Community", Inter-tribal Council of Michigan, 2012
Native Americans in Michigan Databases, Mainly Michigan website, includes "Durant Roll of 1908" and "Mt. Pleasant Indian School Register (1893 to 1932)"

1870 establishments in Michigan
American Indian reservations in Michigan
Anishinaabe reservations and tribal-areas in the United States
Anishinaabe communities in the United States
Delta County, Michigan
Federally recognized tribes in the United States
Great Lakes tribes
Indigenous peoples in the United States
Menominee County, Michigan
Native American tribes in Michigan
Potawatomi